The 1963 Dwars door België was the 19th edition of the Dwars door Vlaanderen cycle race and was held on 6–7 April 1963. The race started and finished in Waregem. The race was won by Clément Roman.

General classification

References

1963
1963 in road cycling
1963 in Belgian sport